Giulio Angolo del Moro, (commonly called Angeli), the brother of Battista, was a sculptor, architect, and painter. He was a native of Verona, but laboured chiefly at Venice, and in the churches and the Doge's Palace of that city he has left several pictures. He flourished in the 16th century and the beginning of the 17th. There is no record of him later than 1618. There was a third brother, Girolamo, who was also a painter, but of no great merit.

References

 

Year of birth unknown
Year of death unknown
16th-century Italian painters
Italian male painters
16th-century Italian architects
17th-century Italian painters
Italian Renaissance painters
Artists from Verona
Architects from Verona
16th-century Italian sculptors
Italian male sculptors